Happiest Nuclear Winter is the second studio album by American rock band The Brobecks. It was self-recorded, and produced by Matt Glass and The Brobecks and released in January 2005. On the band’s Bandcamp page frontman Dallon Weekes wrote the following when describing this album, “Pretty ambitious for kids who still didn't know what they were doing. Recorded in my garage. Produced by a young upstart named Matt Glass.”

Track listing
All songs written and arranged by Dallon Weekes and Michael Gross.

C'mon Vietnam - 5:24
Better Than Me - 4:54
Everyone's a Jerk But Me- 3:45
One Minute of Fun - 1:43
You Stole My Head - 5:43
Ollie - 3:46
A Letter - 2:52
And Shoot the Sun - 6:33
Boring	- 1:42
File Code No. 1459 - 4:52
Die Alone - 3:32
She's a Robot - 8:29
B-Sides (As listed on www.glassbrain.com):
Christmas Drag - 3:54
Globular - 1:45

Personnel
 Dallon Weekes   - vocals, bass guitar, guitar, keyboard
 Matthew Glass    - drums, orchestration, keyboard
 Michael Gross - vocals, guitar
 Bryan Szymanski - keyboard, piano, synths

References

2005 albums